Baaghi- Ek Yoddha is a 2019 Indian, Bhojpuri language action romantic drama film directed by Shekhar Sharma and produced by Jayant Ghosh with co-produced by Kaleem Khan under banner of "JR Production House". It stars Khesari Lal Yadav and Kajal Raghwani in the lead roles, while Ritu Singh, Prakash Jais, Maya Yadav, Vinod Mishra and Ayaz Khan in supporting roles. The film's music was composed by Madhukar Anand with lyrics by Pyarelal, Azad Singh and Shyam Dehati.

Cast
Khesari Lal Yadav
Kajal Raghwani
Ritu Singh
Ayaz Khan
Maya Yadav
Prakash Jais
Deepak Sinha
Vinod Mishra
Baleshwar Singh

Production
The film is directed by Shekhar Sharma and produced by Jayant Ghosh with co-produced by Kaleem Khan and written by Arvind Tiwari. The cinematography has been done by R R Prince while choreography is by Sanjay Korve. Brijesh Malviya is the editor and VFX done by Sonu Maddhesiya. It will be released in 2019.

Music
Soundtrack of "Baaghi" is composed by Madhukar Anand with lyrics penned by Pyare Lal Yadav, Azad Singh and Shyam Dehati. It is produced under the "Worldwide Records " Music company, who also bought his satellite rights.

Track list

Marketing
First-look poster of this film was released on 6 September 2019 at official Instagram handle of Khesari Lal Yadav.

Trailer of this film is released on 7 September 2019 at official YouTube channel of "Worldwide Records Bhojpuri", he received more than 2 million views in just 10 hours.

Film is scheduled to release on 4 October 2019(dussehara)  in all theatres.

References

2010s Bhojpuri-language films